Greg Herenda (born April 2, 1961) is an American 
basketball coach and former player. He is currently an assistant coach at Elon. He is the former head coach of the Fairleigh Dickinson Knights men's basketball team. and previously served as the head coach at UMass Lowell.

Biography
Herenda grew up in North Bergen, New Jersey and played high school basketball at St. Peter's Preparatory School.

Coaching career

After playing at Merrimack College, where he set the single game record for assists in a game with 22, Herenda joined the Warriors coaching staff, where he stayed for four seasons before joining the staff at Holy Cross. He also had stints as an assistant with Seton Hall, Yale, and East Carolina before landing his first head coaching job at Elgin Community College in 2006–07.

In his one and only season with ECC, Herenda guided the team to an 18–11 record, helping the squad reach the Region IV District B Junior College Championship game for the first time in school history. After a one-year stop as the head coach of Division III Cabrini College, Herenda was hired at UMass Lowell, where he led the team to a 21–8 record and second-place finish in the Northeast-10 Conference. It sparked a run of four-straight appearances in the NCAA Men's Division II Basketball Championship, averaging 19 wins per season in his first five years at the helm.

On April 24, 2013, Herenda accepted the head coaching job at Fairleigh Dickinson, replacing Greg Vetrone. In his third year with Fairleigh Dickinson, Herenda coached a team that started no upperclassmen, (four sophomores and one freshman) to the school's first Northeast Conference Championship since 2005. This coaching performance earned him NABC District 18 Coach of the Year honors.

Head coaching record

College

References

1961 births
Living people
American men's basketball coaches
American men's basketball players
Basketball coaches from New Jersey
Basketball players from New Jersey
College men's basketball head coaches in the United States
East Carolina Pirates men's basketball coaches
Fairleigh Dickinson Knights men's basketball coaches
Holy Cross Crusaders men's basketball coaches
Junior college men's basketball coaches in the United States
Merrimack Warriors men's basketball coaches
Merrimack Warriors men's basketball players
People from North Bergen, New Jersey
Seton Hall Pirates men's basketball coaches
Sportspeople from Hudson County, New Jersey
St. Peter's Preparatory School alumni
UMass Lowell River Hawks men's basketball coaches
Yale Bulldogs men's basketball coaches